Chuhuiv Observational Station (or Chuguev Observational Station) of the Institute of Astronomy of Kharkiv National University is an astronomical observatory founded in the early 1960s near the village of Ivanovka, Chuhuiv Raion, Kharkiv Oblast, Ukraine. The founder of the observatory was Nikolai P. Barabashov. The main instrument of the observatory is 70-cm reflector AZT-8. The observational station hosted one of the first coherent optics processors used to reduce astronomical observations. The main topics of the observations conducted on the observational station are photometric observations of asteroids and monitoring of space debris. In particular, the observations conducted here significantly contributed to the introduction of H-G1-G2 asteroid magnitude system and to the discovery of the YORP effect for several asteroids

References

External links
  
 
 
 

Astronomical observatories in Ukraine
National University of Kharkiv
Buildings and structures in Kharkiv Oblast
Chuhuiv
Kharkiv Observatory